St Mary's Hospital was created from a workhouse situated on Dunstable Road in Luton. Several of the original buildings still exist today. Following the introduction of the National Health Service in 1948 the site became St Mary's Hospital and the central block of the main building is now a care home for elderly people. It is a Grade II listed building.

History 

The facility's origins lie in the Luton Union Workhouse which was built on land donated by the Marquis of Bute. The central block was designed by John Williams and opened in 1836.

An infirmary block was built to the west of the central block in the 1870s and was replaced by a new infirmary building to the north of the central block in 1912.

After the medical facilities had absorbed the central block itself, the whole site became St Mary's Hospital in 1930 and it joined the National Health Service in 1948.

The main block was subsequently acquired by Bupa, refurbished and then converted into a care home for elderly residents.

Notes

References 

History of Bedfordshire
Hospitals in Bedfordshire
Hospital buildings completed in 1836
Listed buildings in Luton
Private hospitals in the United Kingdom